Zhanakala (Jañaqala) is a town in north-western Kazakhstan. It is the seat of Zhanakala District in West Kazakhstan Region. Population:

Geography
The town is located close to where the Kushum river flows into lake Birkazan.

References

Populated places in West Kazakhstan Region